Market Street is a road in the city centre of York, in England.

History
The line of the street is immediately outside the Roman walls of Eboracum.  It is first recorded in the 12th-century, as Bretgate, believed to mean "Street of the Britons".  It was later known as Jubbergate.  In the 1760s, the Little Theatre existed on the street, while in 1796, a Congregationalist chapel was constructed on it, becoming a Unitarian chapel in 1816.

In 1836, Parliament Street was constructed, cutting across the middle of Jubbergate, and entailing the demolition of the chapel.  The longer, south-western section of the road was widened in 1852, and then renamed "Market Street".  The street now forms part of the city's central shopping area, although it has been described as "secondary in terms of retail outlets".

Layout and architecture
The street runs north-east, from its junction with Coney Street and Spurriergate, to Parliament Street.  Beyond Parliament Street, its short continuation retains the old name of Jubbergate.  Feasegate leads off the north-western side off the street, while Peter Lane leads off the south-eastern side.

The notable buildings on the street lie on the south-eastern side: 15 Market Street is a four-storey, mid-19th century building, while 21 Market Street is early 18th-century, and the Burns Hotel is mid-19th century.  Conversely, the modern buildings at 8-10 Market Street and 20 Market Street are labelled "poorer examples" by the City of York Council.

References

Streets in York